Jennifer Rachel Landon is an American actress. She is known for her role as Teeter on the Paramount Network series, Yellowstone (2020–present). She is also known for her role as Gwen Norbeck Munson in the CBS soap opera As the World Turns (2005–2010). For her part on the show, Landon won three consecutive Daytime Emmy Award for Outstanding Younger Actress in a Drama Series.

Early life
Landon is the daughter of actor Michael Landon and his third wife, Cindy Clerico. She is the half-sister of screenwriter Christopher B. Landon and director Michael Landon, Jr.; actor Mark Landon is her adoptive brother. She graduated from Brentwood School, before moving to New York City to attend New York University, where she appeared in several theater productions. Her paternal grandfather was Jewish, whereas her paternal grandmother was Catholic, although her father was raised Jewish.

Career
Landon received her first acting job at age five from her father, when he cast her to play a little girl in one of the final episodes of his television series, Highway to Heaven. Before his death in 1991, Jennifer worked with her father once more when he cast her as Jennifer Kramer in the pilot for what would have been his next television series, Us. 

In 2004, Landon co-starred in an independent film L.A. DJ. In early 2005, she was cast to play Gwen Norbeck Munson for one episode on the CBS daytime soap opera As the World Turns. She was soon signed to a three-year contract with the series. Landon won the Daytime Emmy Award for Outstanding Younger Actress in a Drama Series three years in a row for her portrayal. In late 2006, the character's storyline focused on her pursuing a music career recording two singles, "Slide" and "I Saw Love". Performed by Landon, both songs were written by Nini Camps. From April to July 2007, Landon played dual roles on As the World Turns; her regular character Gwen Norbeck Munson, and a lookalike named Cleo Babbitt. Landon left the show in 2008, but reprised her role in 2010 for the final two weeks of the series.

On May 1, 2012, it was announced that Landon would become the third adult actress to portray the role of Heather Stevens on The Young and the Restless. She portrayed the role for less than a year, before her character was written off. In 2016, she was cast as Lilith Bode, the wife of a serial killer, in the final season of Banshee.

In 2020, during the third season of the Paramount network’s series, Yellowstone, Landon was cast in the role of Teeter.

Filmography

Film

Television

Awards and nominations

References

External links
 

American people of English descent
American people of British-Jewish descent
21st-century American actresses
American film actresses
American people of Jewish descent
American soap opera actresses
American television actresses
Daytime Emmy Award winners
Daytime Emmy Award for Outstanding Younger Actress in a Drama Series winners
Living people
People from Malibu, California
People from the San Fernando Valley
Michael Landon family
Year of birth missing (living people)